Haemodorum planifolium is a shrub native to southeastern Australia.

References

planifolium
Flora of New South Wales
Flora of Queensland